Nallathoru Kudumbam is a 1979 Indian Tamil-language drama film, directed by K. Vijayan. It stars Sivaji Ganesan and Vanisri. The film was a remake of the Telugu film Aalu Magalu.

Plot
Raja and his friend, Vanisri get married as per the dying wish of Raja's grandfather. Their marital life gets affected due to a misunderstanding regarding one of Raja's ex-girlfriends Rajni when she calls him in his capacity as a doctor to save her son's life. Her son dies as Vanisri hides the call suspecting that they are having an affair. They break up with Sivaji taking their son. She is however pregnant and she brings up her son independently to show that a son without a father can do well, just as he endeavors to show that a son without mother can do well too. Both the sons grow up well and are studious while also being in love with their colleagues. They get married and the respective daughter-in-laws mistreat both Sivaji and Vanisri. They realize that while sons had been their focus, they had lost their marital lives in the process. Situation forces them to come together so that they can fix their son's lives.

Cast

Sivaji Ganesan
Vanisri
Deepa
Thengai Srinivasan
Manorama
V. K. Ramasamy
Nagesh (Special Appearance)
K. Balaji
A. Sakunthala
Vijayalalitha
Major Sundarrajan
M. R. R. Vasu
G. Srinivasan
Master Sekhar
Kutty Padmini
T. P. Muthulakshmi

Soundtrack
The music was composed by Ilaiyaraaja.

Reception
Kalki negatively reviewed the film.

References

External links
 

1970s Tamil-language films
1979 films
Films directed by K. Vijayan
Films scored by Ilaiyaraaja
Indian drama films
Tamil remakes of Telugu films